Fender is an unincorporated community in Randolph County, Arkansas, United States.

References

Unincorporated communities in Randolph County, Arkansas
Unincorporated communities in Arkansas